The Creek Drank the Cradle is the first studio album by the American musician Iron & Wine (aka Sam Beam). It was released on September 24, 2002. The vinyl LP release had a bonus 7" vinyl single. The promotional CD for this album was released in a cardboard sleeve with different artwork.

Background
The sparse lo-fi sound of the album is attributed to Beam recording the tracks at home on a four-track recorder, initially as demos. His intention was to pass these on to Joey Burns and John Convertino of the band Calexico who provided a rhythm section on the finished piece. However, the demos were released instead.

Reception

The Creek Drank the Cradle has received widespread critical acclaim since its release. At Metacritic, which assigns a normalized rating out of 100 to reviews from mainstream critics, the album received an average score of 87, based on 14 reviews, which indicates "universal acclaim".

Pitchfork placed The Creek Drank the Cradle at number 137 on its list of the top 200 albums of the 2000s. Tim Sendra of AllMusic called it "a stunning debut and one of the best records of 2002".

Track listing

References

Iron & Wine albums
2002 debut albums
Sub Pop albums
Lo-fi music albums